Aloÿs Nizigama (born 18 June 1966) is a retired Burundian long-distance runner who specialized in the 5000 and 10,000 metres.

His personal best 10,000 metres time was 27:20.38 minutes, achieved in July 1995 in London. This is the current Burundian record.

In his career, Nizigama ran 21 sub-28 minute 10,000 metres races, 2nd only to Haile Gebrselassie with 23 times.

International competitions

References

External links

1966 births
Living people
Burundian male long-distance runners
Burundian male cross country runners
Olympic male long-distance runners
Olympic athletes of Burundi
Athletes (track and field) at the 1996 Summer Olympics
Athletes (track and field) at the 2000 Summer Olympics
World Athletics Championships athletes for Japan
Japan Championships in Athletics winners
20th-century Burundian people
21st-century Burundian people